The Pilatus Railway (PB) is a mountain railway in Switzerland and the steepest rack railway in the world, with a maximum gradient of 48% and an average gradient of 35%. The line runs from Alpnachstad, on Lake Alpnach, to a terminus near the Esel summit of Pilatus at an elevation of 2,073 m (6,801 ft), which makes it the highest railway in the canton of Obwalden and the second highest in Central Switzerland after the Furka line. At Alpnachstad, the Pilatus Railway connects with steamers on Lake Lucerne and with trains on the Brünigbahn line of Zentralbahn.

History 
It was concluded that the project was not economically viable. Eduard Locher, an engineer with great practical experience, proposed an alternative project with the maximum grade increased to 48%, cutting the distance in half. Conventional systems at the time could not negotiate such gradients because the cogwheel that is pressed to the rack from above may, under higher gradients, jump out of engagement with the rack, eliminating the train's driving and braking power. Instead, Locher placed a horizontal double rack between the two rails with the rack teeth facing each side. This was engaged by two flanged cogwheels mounted on vertical shafts underneath the car.

This design eliminated the possibility of the cogwheels climbing out of the rack, and prevented the car from toppling over, even under severe crosswinds common in the area. The system was also capable of guiding the car without the need for flanges on the wheels. Indeed, the first cars on Pilatus had no flanges on running wheels, but they were later added to allow cars to be moved through tracks without rack rails during maintenance. Construction began in March 1886, and it took four hundred working days during the summer months of three years to accomplish the feat. Six hundred laborers, mostly Italians were employed. The line was opened on 4 June 1889, and was electrified  in 1937, using an overhead electric supply of 1,650 V DC. The line is still operated with the 1937 carriages. The first year the line counted 35,000 passengers, by 1901 a million had travelled on top of the Pilatus by rail.

The government provided no subsidy for the construction of the line. Instead, Locher established his own company "Locher Systems" to build the railway. The railway was built entirely with private capital and has remained financially viable throughout its life.

The Pilatus Railway was named a Historic Mechanical Engineering Landmark by the American Society of Mechanical Engineers in 2001.

Gallery

Operation 

Because of the rack-system, there are no conventional points or switches on the line, only rotary switches (see photograph) and traversers. All rails are laid on solid rock, securing rails by high-strength iron ties attached to the rock, without using any ballast.

The line still uses original rack rails that are now over 100 years old. While they have worn down, it was discovered that this can be fixed by simply turning the rails over, providing a new wearing surface that would be sufficient for the next century as well. The cars' electric motors are used as generators to brake the car during descent, but this electricity is not reused — it is just dissipated as heat through resistance grids. Originally, the steam engines were used as compressors to provide dynamic braking, since the use of friction brakes alone is not practical on such steep slopes.

The line is operated seasonally: May to October.  The cable car, which approaches from the other side, runs all year except for a short maintenance period.

See also
 List of mountain railways in Switzerland
 List of heritage railways and funiculars in Switzerland
 Rail transport in Switzerland

References

Sources 
Book Tramways and Light Railways of Switzerland and Austria, by R.J.Buckley, published by the Light Rail Transit Association, 1984.

External links 

Pilatus Railway web site
Scientific American 8/13/1904; The Mount Pilatus Railway, Switzerland

Mountain railways
800 mm gauge railways in Switzerland
Railway companies of Switzerland
Railway lines in Switzerland
Rack railways in Switzerland
Transport in Nidwalden
Historic Mechanical Engineering Landmarks
Heritage railways in Switzerland